Cirkusrevyen 1936 is a 1936 Danish comedy film directed by Lau Lauritzen Jr. and Alice O'Fredericks.

Cast
 Ingeborg Bruhn Bertelsen - Herself / Various roles
 Ludvig Brandstrup - Himself / Various Roles
 Emil Hass Christensen - Himself / Various Roles
 Osvald Helmuth - Himself / Various Roles
 Lau Lauritzen, Jr. - Himself / Various Roles
 August Miehe - Himself / Various Roles

References

External links

1936 films
1936 comedy films
Danish comedy films
1930s Danish-language films
Danish black-and-white films
Films directed by Lau Lauritzen Jr.
Films directed by Alice O'Fredericks